Peter Baxter may refer to:

Peter Baxter (radio producer) (born 1947), British radio producer and cricket commentator
Peter Baxter (filmmaker), British-born filmmaker
Peter Baxter (footballer) (born 1961), Australian rules footballer
 Pete Baxter (Neighbours), fictional character on the Australian soap opera Neighbours